The 2004 Swedish Touring Car Championship season was the 9th Swedish Touring Car Championship (STCC) season. In total nine racing weekends at five different circuits were held; each round comprising two races, making an eighteen-round competition in total.

Teams and drivers

Race calendar and winners

Championship results

Championship Standings

Driver's championship

STCC Challenge

Manufacturer's Championship

References

Swedish Touring Car Championship seasons
Swedish Touring Car Championship
Swedish Touring Car Championship season